Josef Toms (26 January 1922 – 6 April 2016) was a Czech basketball player. He competed in the men's tournament at the 1948 Summer Olympics.

References

1922 births
2016 deaths
Czech men's basketball players
Olympic basketball players of Czechoslovakia
Basketball players at the 1948 Summer Olympics
Place of birth missing